"Killing Me Softly with His Song" is a song composed by Charles Fox with lyrics by Norman Gimbel. The lyrics were written in collaboration with Lori Lieberman after she was inspired by a Don McLean performance in late 1971. Denied writing credit by Fox and Gimbel, Lieberman released her version of the song in 1972, but it did not chart. The song has been covered by many other artists.

In 1973, it became a number-one hit in the United States, Australia and Canada for Roberta Flack, and also reached number six in the UK Singles Chart. In 1996, Fugees recorded the song with Lauryn Hill on lead vocals, their version became a number-one hit in twenty countries. The version by Flack won the 1974 Grammy for Record of the Year and Best Female Pop Vocal Performance. The version by Fugees won the 1997 Grammy for Best R&B Performance by a Duo or Group with Vocal. Propelled by the success of the Fugees track, the 1972 recording by Roberta Flack was remixed in 1996 by Jonathan Peters, with Flack adding some new vocal flourishes; this version topped the Hot Dance Club Play chart. Since then, Flack and Fugees have performed the song together. The versions by the Fugees and Roberta Flack were both placed on the 2021 revised list of Rolling Stone's 500 Greatest Songs of All Time.

After decades of confirming Lieberman's contribution, Fox and Gimbel changed their story about the song's origins to downplay her role. Gimbel threatened McLean with a lawsuit in 2008, demanding he remove from his website an assertion that McLean was the inspiration for "Killing Me Softly," but McLean responded by showing Gimbel the latter's own words confirming the inspiration, published in 1973.

Lori Lieberman version
Aspiring musician Lori Lieberman was 19 years old in 1971 when she was introduced to veteran songwriter Norman Gimbel and composer Charles Fox; the two men signed her to a management contract in which they would write her songs and manage her career, and take 20% of her income. The three shared a common Jewish heritage and Scorpio astrological signs, and they began to pool songwriting ideas. Gimbel also began an affair with Lieberman, even though he was 24 years older and married. They kept the affair a secret for years.

In November 1971, Lieberman, then 20, went out with her friend Michele Willens to see Don McLean perform at the Troubadour nightclub in Los Angeles. McLean's hit song "American Pie" was rising in the charts, but Lieberman was strongly affected by McLean singing another song: "Empty Chairs". This song spurred her to write poetic notes on a paper napkin while he was performing the song. Willens confirms that Lieberman was "scribbling notes" on a napkin as soon as McLean began singing the song. After the concert, Lieberman phoned Gimbel to read him her napkin notes and share her experience of a singer reaching deep inside her world with his song. Lieberman's description reminded Gimbel of a song title that was already in his idea notebook, the title "killing us softly with some blues". Gimbel expanded on Lieberman's notes, fleshing them out into song lyrics. Gimbel said in 1973 that "Her conversation fed me, inspired me, gave me some language and a choice of words." Gimbel passed these lyrics to Fox, who set them to music.

Lieberman recorded the song in late 1971 and released it as a single in 1972, produced by Gimbel and Fox. This version did not chart. Lieberman promoted the album by touring, and she always introduced the song "Killing Me Softly" by describing its origin in the McLean performance. Gimbel and Fox even wrote out for her this introduction of the song so that she could deliver it consistently at each performance. In 1973 in her first appearance on national television, Lieberman described this same origin story on The Mike Douglas Show after performing the song. When Lieberman toured through Canada in 1974 to promote her second album, Billboard magazine carried a public relations piece from Capitol Records about the three-way "song-producing team" of Lieberman/Gimbel/Fox, including a description of the Don McLean performance inspiring the song "Killing Me Softly". Gimbel was quoted saying that he relied on Lieberman to inspire his songwriting creativity since he had passed the most creative days of his youth: "Now I need a reason to write, and Lori is one of the best reasons a lyricwriter could have."

Don McLean said in 1973 that he was surprised to find out that the song described his singing. "I'm absolutely amazed. I've heard both Lori's and Roberta's version and I must say I'm very humbled about the whole thing. You can't help but feel that way about a song written and performed as well as this one is."

Disputed origin
In the 1970s both Gimbel and Fox were in agreement with Lieberman about the song's origin at a McLean concert. Sean Derek, who worked for Gimbel and Fox as an assistant in the 1970s, confirmed that the two men would tell the McLean origin story "all the time". However, Gimbel and Fox changed their stories around 1997, to reduce or dismiss Lieberman's contribution.

In 1976, the Lieberman/Gimbel/Fox songwriting team turned sour. Gimbel had divorced his wife three years earlier, but Lieberman eventually stopped the sexual relationship she had with Gimbel because he "had become emotionally abusive, controlling and unfaithful." She asked to be freed of her contract. Gimbel and Fox directed their lawyers to demand $27,000 from Lieberman to pay expenses, and to demand another $250,000 of her future income. Lieberman's lawyer, Frederic Ansis, recalled later that Gimbel and Fox could have been "nice guys" like other managers in the industry who released their unsuccessful artists without onerous payments, but they chose the other route.

By 1997, Lieberman had long severed her ties to Gimbel, but she reconnected with Fox, who attended a concert of hers. Lieberman was interviewed by The New York Times about her recent songwriting work. In this interview she said that when she was young, Gimbel and Fox had been "very, very controlling. I felt like I was pushed on stage, and I was singing other people's material, although that material was based on my private diaries. I felt victimized for most of my early career." Fox never spoke to her again after this revelation.

In 2008, Gimbel demanded that McLean remove text from his website, the text saying that McLean was the inspiration for "Killing Me Softly". McLean did not remove the text; instead, McLean's lawyer sent Gimbel a copy of a 1973 New York Daily News article in which Gimbel is quoted and seems to agree with Lieberman's account. In the article, Lieberman is asked how the song came about and what its inspiration was.

Gimbel's contribution supports Lieberman's stance:

Lieberman then adds:

Fox published a memoir in 2010, Killing Me Softly, My Life in Music, which contained nothing about the McLean performance inspiring the song, and downplayed Lieberman's role in the songwriting team. When Dan MacIntosh of Songfacts asked Fox in 2010 about the McLean origin story, Fox said, "I think it's called an urban legend. It really didn't happen that way." He described Gimbel and himself writing the song, then playing it for Lieberman later, who was reminded of McLean's singing. Fox said that "somehow the words got changed around so that we wrote it based on Don McLean..."

Gimbel described in 2010 how he had been introduced to the Argentinian-born composer Lalo Schifrin (then of Mission: Impossible fame) and began writing songs to a number of Schifrin's films. Both Gimbel and Schifrin made a suggestion to write a Broadway musical together, and Schifrin gave Gimbel an Argentinean novel—Hopscotch by Julio Cortázar—to read as a possible idea. The book was never made into a musical, but in chapter two, the narrator describes himself as sitting in a bar listening to an American pianist friend "kill us softly with some blues". Gimbel put the phrase in his notebook of song ideas for use at a future time.

Lieberman released a song in 2011 called "Cup of Girl" with lyrics about being used by someone who would "rifle through her diary" to write songs about her, who was dishonest, promiscuous and took advantage of her. Lieberman says that Gimbel contacted her after the song was published, sending angry emails, but Lieberman deleted the emails instead of responding to them. Gimbel died in 2018.

In 2020, Lieberman said she was not seeking money or official songwriting credit, she just wanted the world to know the correct origin of the song.

Roberta Flack version

Lieberman was the first to record the song in late 1971, releasing it in early 1972. Helen Reddy has said she was sent the song, but "the demo... sat on my turntable for months without being played because I didn't like the title".

Roberta Flack first heard the song on an airplane, when the Lieberman original was featured on the in-flight audio program. After scanning the listing of available audio selections, Flack would recall: "The title, of course, smacked me in the face. I immediately pulled out some scratch paper, made musical staves [then] play[ed] the song at least eight to ten times jotting down the melody that I heard. When I landed, I immediately called Quincy [Jones] at his house and asked him how to meet Charles Fox. Two days later I had the music." Shortly afterwards Flack rehearsed the song with her band in the Tuff Gong Studios in Kingston, Jamaica, but did not release it. She was unhappy with the background vocals on the various mixes she auditioned. Atlantic executive Tunc Erim assured her it would be a hit song no matter which mix was released. She refused, recalling later that she "wanted to be satisfied with that record more than anything else."

In September 1972, Flack was opening for Quincy Jones at the Los Angeles Greek Theater; after performing her prepared encore song, Flack was advised by Quincy Jones to sing an additional song. Flack later said, "I said 'Well, I have this new song I've been working on'... After I finished, the audience would not stop screaming. And Quincy said, 'Ro, don't sing that daggone song no more until you record it.

Released in January 1973, Flack's version spent a total of five non-consecutive weeks at number one in February and March, more weeks than any other record in 1973. Billboard ranked it as the No. 3 song for 1973.

Charles Fox suggested that Flack's version was more successful than Lieberman's because Flack's "version was faster and she gave it a strong backbeat that wasn't in the original". According to Flack: "My classical background made it possible for me to try a number of things with [the song's arrangement]. I changed parts of the chord structure and chose to end on a major chord. [The song] wasn't written that way." The single appeared as the opening track of her Killing Me Softly album, issued in August 1973.

Flack won the 1973 Grammy Award for Record of the Year and Best Female Pop Vocal Performance, for the single, with Gimbel and Fox earning the Song of the Year Grammy.

In 1996, a house remix of Flack's version went to number one on the US dance chart.

In 1999, Flack's version was inducted into the Grammy Hall of Fame. It ranked number 360 on Rolling Stones list of The 500 Greatest Songs of All Time and number 82 on Billboards greatest songs of all time.

Personnel 
Credits are adapted from AllMusic.

 Roberta Flack – vocals, pianos, rhythm track arrangement 
 Eric Gale – guitars
 Ron Carter – bass
 Grady Tate – drums
 Ralph MacDonald – congas, percussion, tambourine

Charts

Weekly charts

All-time charts

Fugees version

American Hip-hop group Fugees released their version of the song (titled "Killing Me Softly") on their second album The Score (1996), with Lauryn Hill singing the lead vocals. Fugees' version became an international hit, reaching number one on the U.S. Top 40 chart and number two on the U.S. airplay chart. The song topped the charts in over twenty countries. In the United Kingdom it was the best-selling single of 1996, additionally it is the country's biggest hip hop song by a group, and remains one of the best-selling singles of all time in the United Kingdom. It was also the best-selling single of 1996 in Belgium, Germany, Iceland, and the Netherlands. It has since sold 1.36 million copies in United Kingdom, and has been certified 3× Platinum by the British Phonographic Industry. In the United States, the song has been certified 3× Platinum by the Recording Industry Association of America, for selling approximately three million units in the U.S.

This version sampled the 1990 song "Bonita Applebum" by A Tribe Called Quest, which itself samples the riff from the song, "Memory Band" from the psychedelic soul band Rotary Connection. The Fugees single was so successful that the track was "deleted", thus no longer being supplied to retailers whilst the track was still in the top 20, in an effort to draw attention to their next single "Ready or Not".

The Fugees' recording won the 1997 Grammy for Best R&B Performance by a Duo or Group with Vocal and their music video won the MTV Video Music Award for Best R&B Video. "Killing Me Softly" was hailed it as one of the most essential hip hop songs in history by XXL. VH1 placed it on their '100 Greatest Songs of Hip Hop' list. In 2020, the song saw a resurgence in popularity on the social networking app TikTok. The following year, Rolling Stone included it in their revised list of the 500 Greatest Songs of All Time.

Background
"Killing Me Softly" was the last song Fugees recorded for The Score, after member Pras made the suggestion to cover it. They wanted to "see how we can create break beats. And of course, we all love A Tribe Called Quest and we went in like 'Okay, let's cut that sample.'" They then added a bass reggae drop. Initially, Fugees wanted to change the lyrics of the song to make it anti-drugs and anti-poverty but the songwriters, Norman Gimbel and Charles Fox, refused.

Composition
Fugees' version features "percussive rhythms" with "a synth sitar sound, Wyclef's blurted chants, Hill's vocal melisma on the scatted bridge, and a bombastic drum-loop track".

Critical reception
J.D. Considine from The Baltimore Sun felt that Lauryn Hill's rendition of "Killing Me Softly" "is so convincing, you'd think it was a sample." Celebrating the album's 20th anniversary in February 2016, Kenneth Partridge from Billboard said, "It's a lovely cover that maintains the spirit of the original while taking the material in new directions." Upon the release, the magazine's Larry Flick viewed it as a "crafty cover". Peter Miro from Cash Box stated that the trio's reworking of the Roberta Flack standard "succeeds wildly." He explained, "Basically they dropped a new rasta engine in the ballad for the diddly-bopping, head-nodding masses. Bet this will be the only version they think exists." Another editor, Gil L. Robertson IV, picked it as a "standout track" of The Score album. Alan Jones from Music Week deemed it "a sensational update", adding that it "touches myriad musical bases, appealing equally to pop, R&B, easy listening and dance fans. Stripped to its bare bones, it is beautifully sung, with just enough rapping to set it apart from the original. The whole thing is superbly underlined by a bumping bass and percussion. Simple, refreshing and a huge hit." James Hamilton from the RM Dance Update noted it as a "plaintive girl and muttering chaps' sparse bass bumped and sitar plinked but still tenderly crooned remake". In January 1997, Spin described the song as "an instant classic, pumped out of every passing car from coast to coast, with Lauryn Hill's timeless voice never losing its poignant kick".

Music video
The accompanying music video for "Killing Me Softly", directed by Aswad Ayinde and based on Lauryn Hill's ideas, never came out commercially in America. The video depicts the trio watching a movie in a cinema. It also features a cameo of Roberta Flack.

Bounty Killer remix
Fugees recorded a dancehall version with Bounty Killer rapping, and Hill singing a rewritten chorus. However, they did not receive permission to release it on The Score.

Track listing
 UK CD1
 "Killing Me Softly"  – 4:03
 "Killing Me Softly"  – 4:03
 "Cowboys"  – 3:35
 "Nappy Heads"  – 3:49

 UK CD2
 "Killing Me Softly"  – 4:16
 "Fu-Gee-La"  – 4:15
 "Vocab"  – 4:07
 "Vocab"  – 5:54

Charts

Weekly charts

Year-end charts

Decade-end charts

All-time charts

Sales and certifications

Release history

Notable cover versions 
The song has been recorded by a number of other artists, including:
Johnny Mathis (1973)
 Perry Como - And I Love You So (1973) 
 Cleo Laine and John Williams (1976) 
 Precious Wilson and Sky Train (1980) 
 Luther Vandross (1994) 
 Amii Stewart (1994)

See also
List of number-one singles in Australia during the 1970s
List of RPM number-one singles of 1973
List of number-one singles in 1973 (New Zealand)
List of Hot 100 number-one singles of 1973 (U.S.)
List of number-one singles in Australia during the 1990s
List of number-one hits of 1996 (Austria)
List of Dutch Top 40 number-one singles of 1996
List of European number-one hits of 1996
List of number-one hits of 1996 (France)
List of number-one singles of 1996 (Ireland)
List of number-one singles in 1996 (New Zealand)
List of number-one singles from the 1990s (UK)
List of number-one dance singles of 1996 (U.S.)
List of Mainstream Top 40 number-one hits of 1996 (U.S.)
List of Billboard Rhythmic number-one songs of the 1990s

References

1971 songs
1973 singles
1996 singles
Soul ballads
Pop ballads
Fugees songs
Songs with lyrics by Norman Gimbel
Songs with music by Charles Fox (composer)
Roberta Flack songs
Billboard Hot 100 number-one singles
Cashbox number-one singles
Number-one singles in Australia
Number-one singles in Austria
RPM Top Singles number-one singles
Number-one singles in the Czech Republic
Number-one singles in Denmark
European Hot 100 Singles number-one singles
Number-one singles in Finland
SNEP Top Singles number-one singles
Number-one singles in Germany
Number-one singles in Hungary
Number-one singles in Iceland
Irish Singles Chart number-one singles
Number-one singles in Italy
Dutch Top 40 number-one singles
Number-one singles in New Zealand
Number-one singles in Norway
Number-one singles in Scotland
Number-one singles in Zimbabwe
UK Singles Chart number-one singles
Grammy Hall of Fame Award recipients
Grammy Award for Record of the Year
Grammy Award for Song of the Year
Grammy Award for Best Female Pop Vocal Performance
Songs about music
Songs about musicians
Capitol Records singles
Atlantic Records singles
Columbia Records singles
Ruffhouse Records singles